The Guardia di Finanza (G. di F. or GdF) (English: literal: Guard of Finance, paraphrased: Financial Police or Financial Guard) is an Italian law enforcement agency under the authority of the Minister of Economy and Finance. It is a militarized police force, forming a part of the Ministry of Economy and Finance, not the Ministry of Defence.  Guardia di Finanza is essentially responsible for dealing with financial crime and smuggling; it has also evolved into Italy's primary agency for suppressing the illegal drug trade. It maintains over 600 boats and ships and more than 100 aircraft to serve in its mission of patrolling Italy's territorial waters. 
It also has the role of border police and customs duties at Italian airports.

Interpol summarizes the Guardia di Finanza (Ministry of Economy and Finance) as "a force with military status and nationwide remit for financial crime investigations and illegal drugs trafficking investigations".

Mission
The mission and institutional tasks of Guardia di Finanza are stated in the law 189 of April 23, 1959 and 68/2001 and are subdivided into priority ones (preventing, investigating and reporting financial evasions and violations, overseeing the compliance with the provisions of politico-economic interest and surveillance at sea for financial police purposes) and contribution ones (maintaining public order and safety and political-military defense of the borders).

The primary mission of the Guardia di Finanza is to protect the legal economy and the businesses operating in compliance with the law, while ensuring that the Republic, the European Union, the regions, and the local governments can rely on a regular inflow and appropriate use of the resources meant for the community, and for supporting policies for economic and social revival and development.

Its activities are connected with financial, economic, judiciary and public safety: tax evasion, financial crimes, smuggling, money laundering, international illegal drug trafficking, illegal immigration, human trafficking, modern slavery, customs and borders checks, copyright violations, anti-Mafia operations, credit card fraud, cybercrime, counterfeiting currency, terrorist financing, maintaining public order, and safety, political and military defense of the Italian borders.

Europol (the EU's law enforcement agency), summarizes this force as "organized according to a military structure ... The tasks of the Guardia di Finanza consist of the prevention, search and denunciation of evasions and financial violations, in the supervision of the observance of the provisions of political and economic interest and in the surveillance at sea for financial police purposes. Therefore the Guardia di Finanza is a police force with general jurisdiction over all economic and financial matters; it also contributes to the maintenance of order and public security and to military defense along national borders".

History

Light Troops Legion (1774)

The origins of the Guardia di Finanza date back to October 5, 1774, when the "Light Troops Legion" (Legione truppe leggere) was set up under the King of Sardinia, Victor Amadeus III. This was the first example in Italy of a special corps established and organized for financial surveillance duties along the borders, as well as for military defense.

Customs Guards Corps (1862)
Once the unification of Italy was completed in 1862, the "Customs Guards Corps" (Corpo delle Guardie doganali) was set up. Its main task was Customs surveillance and co-participation in the Country's defense during wartime.

Corpo della Regia Guardia di Finanza (1881)
By Law no. 141 dated April 8, 1881, the Customs Guards Corps became the "Corps of the Royal Finance Guard" (Corpo della Regia Guardia di Finanza) whose task was to "impede, suppress and report smuggling activities and any other violation and transgression of financial laws and regulations", and to safeguard the interests of the tax administration, as well as to co-participate in enforcing law and order and public security.

Twentieth century
By Royal Decree dated July 14, 1907, the Corps was issued 5-point star uniforms to mark its military status, even though the Army's military discipline regulation was extended to the Financial Guard by Law dated July 12, 1908. The Corps served in the two World Wars and in the War of National Liberation, deserving 18 awards to its War Flag, which had been granted in 1914 to decree the total integration among the Italian Armed Forces.

Subsequently, the Corps took part in numerous rescue operations during serious natural disasters; for this commitment the Corps was decorated with 13 additional civil valor awards.

The re-organization of the police forces in 1919 also affected the Royal Guardia di Finanza. The responsibilities were divided between the Inspector General, who was an Army Officer with the rank of Lieutenant General responsible for military preparation, and the Commanding General, who was a Financial Guard Officer subordinate to the former, but authorized to maintain direct relations with the Minister for ordinary institutional duties and for personnel management. In 1923, the "Investigative Tax Police" was set up as a specialized branch of the Royal Financial Guard. Within a few years, its naval fleet, motor-vehicles and telecommunication structure underwent a complete change; the Statistical Service equipped with a data processing centre, the Air Service and the Canine Service (for anti-drugs checks) were set up. During the same years, the Corps’ general organization was defined pursuant to Law no. 189 dated April 23, 1959, which laid down its institutional tasks, subsequently amended by specific sector provisions assigning certain responsibilities.

Recent history
Besides the review of its organizational structure, laid out by the issuance of Presidential Decree Law no. 34 dated January 29, 1999, the updating of the Corps’ institutional tasks was completed. Law Decree no. 68, dated March 19, 2001, whilst confirming the Corps’ configuration as a military structure, enhanced its role as a police force having general competence on all economic, financial and judicial matters for the safeguard of the public budget and that of the regions, of the local authorities and of the European Union.

The Guardia di Finanza Historical Museum is custodian of the traditions of the Corps. It preserves artifacts of relevance to the Guardia di Finanza and promotes historical research, to aid researchers, scholars and military history enthusiasts.

Chiasso financial smuggling case

On June 3, 2009 near Chiasso, Switzerland (near the Swiss/Italian border), officers of the Corps detained two Japanese nationals in their 50s who had attempted to enter Switzerland and had in their possession a suitcase with a false bottom containing U.S. Treasury Bonds worth $134.5 billion.
These later turned out to be counterfeit.

Organization

The Guardia di Finanza is a militarized police force, corpo di polizia ad ordinamento militare, like the Carabinieri, but forming a part of the Ministry of Economy and Finance, not the Ministry of Defence.

Under the minister of finance and economy, the Corps is commanded by a General Commander and a Second-in-Command.

Commands
Under the general command are the following commands:
 Comando dei Reparti Speciali (Special Forces Command)
 Special Unit of the Currency Police
 Central Service for the Investigation of Organized Crime
 Special Unit for Revenue and Public Expenditure
 Unit for the Prevention of Community Frauds
 Special Units Command, which cooperates directly with other government agencies, parliamentary commissions, and other central authorities.
 Comando Aeronavale Central (Central Aeronaval Command)
Aeronaval Operations Command, with one aeromaritime exploration group, and three aeronaval groups.
 Aviation Center
 Naval Center
Source:

Territorial organization
 Territorial commands
 Six interregional commands 
 Regional commands, one for each of the 20 Italian regions.
 Provincial commands, one for each of Italy's provinces.
 Territorial units
 74 Groups (of which five are Counter-terrorism Rapid Response Groups)
 104 Financial Police Units
 198 Companies
 202 Lieutenant Units (Stations)
 48 Brigades
 26 Mountain Rescue Stations 
Source:
 Aeronaval units
 15 Aeronaval Operational Units
 16 Naval Stations
 41 Operational Naval Sections
 13 Aviation Sections
Source:

Special departments
 Gruppo di Investigazione Criminalità Organizzata (GICO): Organized Crime Investigation Group.
 Gruppo Operativo Antidroga (GOA): Counter-narcotics Group
 Gruppo Anticrimine Tecnologico (GAT): Counter-cybercrime Group
 Gruppo Tutela Patrimonio Archeologico: Stolen Art Recovery Group
 Antiterrorismo Pronto Impiego (ATPI): Antiterrorism and Rapid Response Service
 Servizio Cinofili: Police Dog Division (K9).

International anti-drug operations 
From the statistic data of the anti-drug service central Direction, of the Department of the Interior, 60% of the drug seized in Italy by law enforcement bodies is found by the Guardia di Finanza.
The Guardia di Finanza is responsible for 77% of the Heroin seizures, 69% of Cocaine seizures and 54% of cannabis (including Hashish) seizures.

On 9 August 2018, the Guardia di Finanza intercepted research ship Remus (Panama-flagged) in the Mediterranean Sea. The ship was taken to Palermo in Sicily for further investigation, according to Guardia di Finanza.
Following the investigation, the authorities discovered 20 tons of hashish hidden in the ship's fuel tanks.
The entire Remus crew of eleven has been arrested. All of them are nationals of Montenegro, the authorities informed.
The hashish, worth between EUR 150 million and 200 million, was probably destined for the European market.

On 31 January 2019 the Guardia di Finanza seized more than 2 tons of cocaine in Genoa, northern Italy, which were on board a ship coming from Colombia and heading to Barcelona, Spain. «1,801 pure cocaine cakes, for a total weight of over 2,100 kilograms». The seized cocaine has an estimated value of about 500 million euros: it is the largest seizure of cocaine found in Italy in the last 25 years.

On July 29, 2019, the Guardia di Finanza of Genoa seized  of cocaine, with the collaboration and undercover agents of the United States D.E.A., the U.S. Customs and Border Protection and the Colombian National Police. The drug was in a ship from Colombia and direct to the Calabrian mafia called 'Ndrangheta.

On July 1, 2020, a world record in drugs seized by the Italian Guardia di Finanza in Naples: 14 tons of amphetamines, 84 million tablets with logo "captagon" produced in Syria by ISIS/Daesh to finance terrorism. More than 1 billion euro market value.
This is the largest seizure of amphetamines in the world, carried out by the Neapolitan Guardia di Finanza in execution of a specific decree issued by the Public Prosecutor of Naples - DDA and developed as part of a complex investigation activity delegated to the GICO (organized crime investigation unit of the guardia di finanza) against a network of criminal groups aiming to import a huge amount of drugs for European consumers. After the lockdown period, due to the epidemiological emergency from Covid 19, in fact, law enforcement activities have been intensified in the specific sector.
From the development of the clues that emerged during the investigation and particularly from other seizures previously made, the guardia di finanza tracked 3 suspect containers shipped to the port of Salerno, allegedly containing paper cylinders for industrial and machinery use.
After the seizure, the GICO of NAPLES moved the containers to an equipped factory to carry out the internal inspection.
The paper cylinders, about 2 meters high and 140 cm in diameter - likely built in Germany - were designed in multilayer in order to conceal the drugs. A perfect wall against the scan detection.
In the inner layers, about 350 kg of tablets per cylinder were stored (40 cylinders checked).
A total of 14 tons of amphetamines have been found, which means 84 million tablets, bearing the symbol of the "captagon" which distinguishes the "jihad drug" made by ISIS. ISIS / Daesh finances its own terrorist activities especially by means of drug trafficking, the synthetic ones massively produced in Syria, which has become for this reason in recent years the first world producer of amphetamines.
The captagon is marketed throughout the Middle East and then widespread both among fighters to inhibit fear and pain and among civilians as a fatigue relief. Initially produced mainly in Lebanon and widespread in Saudi Arabia in the 90s, this drug has also been used by terrorists in the attack to Bataclan on Paris in 2015 - thus becoming the "Isis drug" or "Jihad drug".
According to the American DEA (Drug Enforcement Administration), ISIS makes extensive use of it in all the territories over which it has influence. Once the chemical plants of production are set, ISIS can easily produce large amounts of tablets for the world market of synthetic drugs, and therefore quickly funding their terror plots.
Two weeks ago, still in the port of Salerno, the specialists of the Organized Crime Investigation Group (GICO) of the Guardia di Finanza, detected and seized another container with a roofing load consisting of counterfeited clothing, hiding 2,800 kg of hashish and 190 kg of amphetamines (over 1 million tablets) with the very same symbol (captagon).
As for the final dealer, no single criminal group can afford a 1-billion purchase, so the investigators think about a "Consortium" of criminal groups, both for the total value of shipments, and for distribution on the reference markets (85 million tablets can satisfy a European market).
The hypothesis is that during the lockdown, due to the emergency worldwide epidemiology, the production and distribution of drugs in Europe has practically stopped and therefore to the recovery many traffickers, even in consortium, have turned to Syria, whose production does not seem to have slowed down.
Further investigations are ongoing to identify all the entities linked to this extraordinary seizure.

On the June 19, 2021 the Guardia di Finanza, during a special operation fight smuggling and narcotic trafficking, seized 6 tonnes of hashish found aboard a USA flagged yacht off the west coast of Sicily. The three crew members on board the vessel, identified as Bulgarian nationals, were arrested and taken to Palermo prison. 
According to the police, the street value of the drugs seized, found hidden in the interior of the ship, is approximately 13 million euros.

On the June 06, 2022, Italian Guardia di Finanza they have pulled off one of Europe's biggest-ever drugs impoundments, seizing 4.3 tonnes of cocaine in the port of Trieste. Investigators said the criminal gangs that bought the narcotics paid around 96 million euros for it and it would have been sold on the Italian market for a total of around 240 million euros. The operation, coordinated by DDA anti-mafia investigators, saw arrests and other freedom-restricting warrants executed with respect to 38 suspects. Around two million euros in cash was impounded too.
Another hard blow to the most important group among Colombian narcotics gangs,” Italian investigators from the northeastern city of Trieste said of the seizure.
The Guardia di Finanza agents said their work had uncovered a “dense network” of ties between South American cocaine producers and European buyers, who answered to organized crime groups operating across Italy, including in Calabria, home of the ‘Ndrangheta mafia.
The investigation lasted more than a year and involved both the Colombian Police, National Spanish Police and US Homeland Security. Besides the cocaine, police also confiscated 1.85 million euros in cash.

Personnel

The Guardia di Finanza utilises a rank structure similar to that of other state police forces in Italy, but with ranks similar to the Italian Army. The Guardia di Finanza has around 68,000 members (agents, senior agents, superintendents, inspectors, and officers). Its personnel are in service in the Europol and OLAF (European Agency of Fight against Fraud). Its Latin motto since 1933 has been Nec recisa recedit.

Officers
There are 3,250 officers in the Guardia di Finanza. Officer cadets for the general and aeronaval branches are recruited through competitive examinations open to Italian citizens, not over 22 years of age, with a high school diploma giving access to university studies. Officer cadets for the technical and logistic branches need a bachelor or master's degree, and to be under the age of 32. The successful cadets graduate as First Lieutenants with a master's degree in Economic and Financial Security Sciences.

Source:

Source:

Source:

Inspectors
There are 24,000 inspectors in the Guardia di Finanza. Participation in the competition for the recruitment of inspectors in the general and naval branches is open to Italian citizens aged between 18 and 26 years, having a diploma of secondary school giving access to university studies. Inspectors in the naval branch continue with a year at the nautical school in Gaeta.

Inspectors are formally classified as senior non-commissioned officers, but are according to training and job description more akin to U.S. warrant officers.

Source:

Superintendents
There are 13,500 superintendents in the Guardia di Finanza. Superintendents are recruited through promotion from the ranks of the senior agents.

Source:

Appointees and Agents
There are 28,000 appointees (senior agents) and agents in the Guardia di Finanza. Competition for appointments as agents trainee is open for Italian citizens with one year's enlistment in the Italian defence forces. Recruits are given basic training at either the Recruit School in Bari or the Alpine School in Predazzo.

Source:

Equipment and vehicles

Weapons
 Pistols: Beretta 92, Beretta 84 BB , Beretta 85 BB and Beretta PX4 Storm
 Submachine gun: Beretta PM 12 S2, Beretta PMX, MP5 and MP7
 Assault rifle: Beretta SC70/90, Beretta ARX160, M4 Carbine and HK416 
 Combat shotgun: SPAS-12 and SPAS-15
 Sniper rifle: Sako TRG-22/42 and Heckler & Koch PSG1
General-purpose machine gun:   MG 42/59
Heavy machine gun: M2 Browning

Cars

 Fiat Grande Punto
 Fiat Nuova Panda
 Land Rover Range Rover
Subaru Forester 
Volkswagen Up
Volkswagen Passat
 Fiat Croma
 Alfa Romeo Giulia
 Alfa Romeo 156
 Alfa Romeo 159
 Fiat Bravo
 Fiat Stilo 1.9 JTD
 Jeep Renegade
 Land Rover Freelander
 Land Rover Defender
 Iveco Massif
 Iveco Daily
 Isuzu D-Max
 Fiat Scudo
 Land Rover Discovery
 Nissan Navara
 Jeep Renegade
 Peugeot 3008
Iveco LMV

Fixed-wing aircraft

Helicopters

Patrol boats

Source: *Note: G.94 Cappelletti was destroyed by a fire on board on July, 2nd, 2021. All 9 crew escaped without injury. Located in 'Retired' section.

Motorboats

Source:

Inland motorboats

Source:

Sailing vessels

Source:

Training ships

Source:

List of Guardia di Finanza retired vessels (since 1950)

Patrol boats

Litoral patrol boats

Fast crafts

Motorboats

Inland water motorboats

Boats

Training ships

Unit awards
The unit awards, as depicted on the unit coat-of-arms, are:
3 blue and gold ribbons for 3 Gold Medals of Military Valour
4 white and gold ribbons for 4 Silver Medals of Military Valour
1 blue ribbon with VI for six Bronze Medals of Military Valour
1 blue and white ribbon with II for two Crosses of Military Valour
1 green-white-red ribbon with IX for nine Gold Medals of Civil Valour
1 blue and red ribbon, with a cross, for 5 Knight's Crosses of the Military Order of Italy

Awards not included in the coat of arms but are included in its State Color are:

 1 Gold Medal of Valor of the Finance Guard (2011)
 1 Silver Medal of Civil Valor
 9 Gold Medals of Civil Merit
 2 separate Medals of Merited Service in Earthquake Relief (1908 and 1915, respectively)
 2 Medals of Benemerited Financial Service
 6 Gold Medals of Benemerited Service to Education, Culture and the Arts
 2 Gold Medals of Benemerited Service to Public Health
 2 Gold Medals of Benemerited Service to the Environment
 1 Gold Medal of Merit of the Department of Civil Defense
 3 Gold Medals of Merit of the Italian Red Cross
 UN Peacekeeping Medal (for service as part of UNMIK Kosovo 1995-2004)
 Gold Medal of the Eagle of the Republic of Albania (1997-2005)
 Military Double Gold Star of Sports Merit (2007)

See also
 Financial Guard (disambiguation)
Gruppi Sportivi Fiamme Gialle
 Law enforcement in Italy
 Tax evasion

References

External links 

 
 The funding of international Islamic terrorism ~ Strategic analysis profiles ~ Guardia di Finanza General Headquarters - 2nd Department – Analysis Unit 
 Annual Report of the Guardia di Finanza 
 Counter-cybercrime Group of the Guardia di Finanza

 
Customs services
Financial crime prevention
Organizations established in 1774
1774 establishments in Italy
Military units and formations established in 1774
Military of Italy
Specialist law enforcement agencies of Italy